The 2003 Trinidadian local elections were held for the regions and municipalities of Trinidad and Tobago. These municipalities and regions were created after the amendment of Act No.8 of 1992.

Regional Corporations

134 Local Areas will be contested in 14 Corporations.

 Diego Martin Regional Corporation
 Port of Spain City Corporation
 San Juan–Laventille Regional Corporation
 Tunapuna–Piarco Regional Corporation
 Arima Borough Corporation
 Sangre Grande Regional Corporation
 Chaguanas Borough Corporation
 Couva–Tabaquite–Talparo Regional Corporation
 San Fernando City Corporation
 Princes Town Regional Corporation
 Penal–Debe Regional Corporation
 Siparia Regional Corporation
 Point Fortin Borough Corporation
 Rio Claro–Mayaro Regional Corporation

Results

Winning Party for each council in bold

References

2003 elections in the Caribbean
2003 in Trinidad and Tobago
2003